Binura Fernando (born 12 July 1995) is a Sri Lankan cricketer who plays for the Sri Lanka national team.

Early and domestic career
He was part of Sri Lanka's squad for the 2014 ICC Under-19 Cricket World Cup. In August 2018, he was named in Dambulla's squad the 2018 SLC T20 League. In October 2020, he was drafted by the Jaffna Stallions for the inaugural edition of the Lanka Premier League. In August 2021, he was named in the SLC Reds team for the 2021 SLC Invitational T20 League tournament. In November 2021, he was selected to play for the Kandy Warriors following the players' draft for the 2021 Lanka Premier League. In July 2022, he was signed by the Jaffna Kings for the third edition of the Lanka Premier League.

International career
He was named in Sri Lanka's Twenty20 International (T20I) squad for their series against Pakistan in July 2015. He made his T20I debut on 30 July 2015. He took his first international wicket by bowling Shahid Afridi.

In May 2021, he was named in Sri Lanka's One Day International (ODI) squad for their series against Bangladesh. He made his ODI debut for Sri Lanka on 28 May 2021, against Bangladesh. In September 2021, Fernando was named as one of four reserve players in Sri Lanka's squad for the 2021 ICC Men's T20 World Cup.

References

External links
 

1995 births
Living people
Sri Lankan cricketers
Sri Lanka One Day International cricketers
Sri Lanka Twenty20 International cricketers
Cricketers from Colombo
Hambantota Troopers cricketers
Southern Express cricketers
Jaffna Kings cricketers
Kandy Falcons cricketers